The Route du Rhum is a single person transatlantic race the 1998 race was the 6th edition and had eight classes with 35 boats taking part.

Results

External Links
 
 Official YouTube Channel

Reference

Route du Rhum
1998 in sailing
Route du Rhum
Single-handed sailing competitions
IMOCA 60 competitions